Connaught Place is a place name of various places in the world:

 Connaught Place, New Delhi in Delhi, India
 Connaught Place (Hong Kong) in Central, Hong Kong
 Connaught Place, London in London, England

 Connaught One, Delhi
 Godrej Connaught Place, Delhi